Valeri Mikhailovich Zelepukin (born 17 September 1968) is a Russian former professional ice hockey player who played in the National Hockey League (NHL) for the New Jersey Devils, Edmonton Oilers, Philadelphia Flyers and the Chicago Blackhawks between 1991 and 2001. Born in Voskresensk in the former Soviet Union, he was drafted 221st overall in the 11th round by the Devils in the 1990 NHL Entry Draft and went on to play 595 regular season games, scoring 117 goals and 177 assists for 294 points. He also picked up 527 penalty minutes.

Zelepukin scored his most famous goal while with New Jersey in Game 7 of the 1994 Eastern Conference Finals against the arch-rival New York Rangers. With 7.7 seconds left on the clock and the Rangers leading 1-0, teammate Claude Lemieux centred the puck to Zelepukin in front of the net. After a couple of attempts, Zelepukin buried the puck past Ranger goaltender Mike Richter to tie the game. Richter protested to referee Bill McCreary that he had been interfered with, but the goal stood. Zelepukin's goal went for nought, however, when New York's Stéphane Matteau scored a dramatic wrap-around goal on Devils goaltender Martin Brodeur in double-overtime to win the game and the series for the Rangers. The Rangers would go on to defeat the Vancouver Canucks to win their first Stanley Cup in 54 years, but Zelepukin and the Devils redeemed themselves the next year, when they won their first Stanley Cup championship in a four-game sweep of the Detroit Red Wings.

Zelepukin also coached KHL team Metallurg Novokuznetsk during the 2016-17 season. However, Zelepukin was fired after the team had a 1-8-0 record.

Career statistics

Regular season and playoffs

International

External links
 

1968 births
Living people
Chicago Blackhawks players
Edmonton Oilers players
Ak Bars Kazan players
Atlant Moscow Oblast players
HC CSKA Moscow players
HC Khimik Voskresensk players
Ice hockey players at the 1998 Winter Olympics
New Jersey Devils draft picks
New Jersey Devils players
Norfolk Admirals players
Olympic ice hockey players of Russia
Olympic silver medalists for Russia
People from Voskresensk
Philadelphia Flyers players
Russian ice hockey right wingers
SKA Saint Petersburg players
Soviet ice hockey right wingers
Stanley Cup champions
Utica Devils players
Olympic medalists in ice hockey
Medalists at the 1998 Winter Olympics
Sportspeople from Moscow Oblast